The following is a chronological list of classical music composers who lived in, worked in, were German citizens, or who grew up and made their careers in Germany.

Medieval
Hildegard von Bingen (1098–1179)

Renaissance
Caspar Othmayr (1515–1553)
Valentin Haussmann ( – )
Hans Leo Hassler (1564–1612)

Baroque
Michael Praetorius (1571–1621)
Andreas Hakenberger (1574–1627)
Heinrich Schütz (1585–1672)
Samuel Scheidt (1587–1653)
Johann Schop  (1590–1667)
Johann Jakob Froberger (1616–1667)
Kaspar Förster (1616–1673)
Heinrich Schwemmer (1621–1696)
Johann Caspar Kerll (1627–1693)
Georg Caspar Wecker (1632–1695)
Adam Krieger (1634–1666)
Johann Philipp Krieger (1649–1725)
Johann Krieger (1651–1735)
Johann Pachelbel (1653–1706)
Christian Friedrich Witt (1660–1717)
Giovanni Henrico Albicastro (1660–1730)
Franz Xaver Murschhauser (1663–1738)
Georg Caspar Schürmann (1672/1673–1751)
Georg Friedrich Kauffmann (1679–1735)
Georg Philipp Telemann (1681–1767)
Johann David Heinichen (1683–1729)
Johann Sebastian Bach (1685–1750)
George Frideric Handel (1685–1759)
Sylvius Leopold Weiss (1687–1750) 
Johann Friedrich Fasch (1688–1758)
Gottfried Heinrich Stölzel (1690–1749)
Johann Christian Hertel (1697–1754)
Johann Joachim Quantz (1697–1773)
Johann Gottlieb Graun (1703–1771)
Carl Heinrich Graun (1704–1759)

Classical era
Johan Agrell (1701–1765)
Johann Ernst Eberlin (1702–1762)
Johann Gottlieb Janitsch (1708–c. 1763)
Christoph Schaffrath (1709–1763)
Wilhelm Friedmann Bach (1710–1784)
Frederick II of Prussia (1712–1786)
Johann Ludwig Krebs (1713–1780)
Carl Philipp Emanuel Bach (1714–1788)
Christoph Willibald Gluck (1714–1787)
Gottfried August Homilius (1714–1785)
Johann Schobert (1720?–1767)
Bernhard Joachim Hagen (1720–1787)
Jakob Friedrich Kleinknecht (1722–1794)
Carl Friedrich Abel (1723–1787)
Johann Wilhelm Hertel (1727–1789)
Hermann Friedrich Raupach (1728–1778)
Florian Leopold Gassmann (1729–1774)
Franz Joseph Haydn (1732–1809)
Johann Christoph Friedrich Bach (1732–1795)
Johann Christian Fischer (1733–1800)
Johann Christian Bach (1735–1782)
Anton Schweitzer (1735–1787)
Johann Gottfried Eckhardt (1735–1809)
Johann Michael Haydn (1737–1806)
Johann Christoph Oley (1738–1789)
Friedrich Wilhelm Herschel (1738–1822)
Ernst Eichner (1740–1777)
Anton Zimmermann (1741–1781)
Roman Hoffstetter (1742–1815)
Johann Peter Salomon (1745–1815)
Johann Wilhelm Hässler (1747–1822)
Joseph Schuster (1748–1812)
Emanuel Aloys Förster (1748–1823)
Theodor von Schacht (1748–1823)
Johann Friedrich Edelmann (1749–1794)
Peter Winter (1754–1825)
Joseph Martin Kraus (1756–1792)
Franz Johannes Gleißner (1759–1818)
Franz Danzi (1763–1826)
Simon Mayr (1763–1845)

Romantic/Post-romantic
Peter Anton Kreusser (1765–1831)
Franz Xaver Kleinheinz (1765–1832)
Ludwig van Beethoven (1770–1827)
Peter Hänsel (1770–1831)
Friedrich Jeremias Witt (1770–1836)
Ferdinand Ries (1784–1838)
Louis Spohr (1784–1859)
Friedrich Wilhelm Michael Kalkbrenner (1785–1849)
Carl Maria von Weber (1786–1826)
Johann Peter Pixis (1788–1874)
Giacomo Meyerbeer (1791–1864)
Heinrich Marschner (1795–1861)
Johann Carl Gottfried Löwe (1796–1869)
Fanny Mendelssohn (1805–1847)
Felix Mendelssohn (1809–1847)
Otto Nicolai (1810–1849)
Robert Schumann (1810–1856)
Ferdinand Hiller (1811–1885)
Emilie Mayer (1812–1883)
Richard Wagner (1813–1883)
Friedrich Robert Volkmann (1815–1883)
Jacques Offenbach (1819–1880)
Clara Schumann (1819–1896)
Peter Cornelius (1824–1874)
Carl Reinecke (1824–1910)
Albert Dietrich (1829–1908)
Johannes Brahms (1833–1897)
Franz Wohlfahrt (1833–1884)
Max Bruch (1838–1920)
Josef Gabriel Rheinberger (1839–1901)
August Friedrich Martin Klughardt (1847–1902)
Philipp Scharwenka (1847–1917)
Fritz Seitz (1848–1918)
Engelbert Humperdinck (1854–1921)
Paul Klengel (1854–1935)
Max Wagenknecht (1857–1922)
Julius Klengel (1859–1933)
Richard Strauss (1864–1949)
Paul Lincke (1866–1946)
Ferdinand Küchler (1867–1937)
Hans Pfitzner (1869–1949)
Max Reger (1873–1916)

Modern/Post-modern/Contemporary
Richard Wetz (1875–1935)
Eduard Künneke (1885–1953)
Wilhelm Furtwängler (1886–1954)
Rudi Stephan (1887–1915)
Carl Orff (1895–1982)
Paul Hindemith (1895–1963)
Herbert Eimert (1897–1972)
Kurt Weill (1900–1950)
Werner Egk (1901–1983)
Stefan Wolpe (1902–1972)
Boris Blacher (1903–1975)
Karl Amadeus Hartmann (1905–1963)
Martin Scherber (1907–1974)
Berthold Goldschmidt (1903–1996)
Bernd Alois Zimmermann (1918–1970)
Fritz Geißler (1921–1984)
Bertold Hummel (1925–2002)
Hans Werner Henze (1926–2012)
Karlheinz Stockhausen (1928–2007)
Helmut Lachenmann (born 1935)
Aribert Reimann (born 1936)
Michael von Biel (born 1937)
Hans-Joachim Hespos (1938–2022)
Nicolaus A. Huber (born 1938)
Johannes Fritsch (1941–2010)
Wolfgang Rihm (born 1952)
Hans-Jürgen von Bose (born 1953)
Alexander Schubert (born 1979)
Tobias Pfeil (born 1992)

German